Prades-le-Lez is a commune in the Hérault department in the Occitanie region in southern France.

Geography

Climate
Prades-le-Lez has a mediterranean climate (Köppen climate classification Csa).

Population

See also
Communes of the Hérault department

References

Communes of Hérault